Jeffrey Hughley (born March 3, 1985) is an American football wide receiver who is currently a free agent. He was signed as an undrafted free agent by the Tulsa Talons in 2010. He finished the season with over 1,000 and 28 touchdowns as a receiver.

College career
Jeff Hughley attended Averett University. He holds the record for most receiving yards in a career or a season. He was also a great kick returner. He was named 2nd Team All-USA South Athletic Conference in 2003.

Professional career

Tulsa Talons
Hugley played for the Tulsa Talons who were a member of the af2 from 2007-2009, winning the af2 Ironman of the Year Award in 2007. He helped the Talons to a 2007 ArenaCup victory, earning game MVP.

Colorado Crush
After an impressive rookie season with the Talons, Hughley signed with the Colorado Crush of the Arena Football League, but he was waived after training camp.

Return to Tulsa Talons
During his Arena Football League rookie season in 2010 with the Talons, Hughley helped the Talons capture the Southwest division title before losing to Tampa Bay Storm in the Conference semi-finals. Hughley was named to his first All-Ironman team, a team made up of the league's best two-way players.

Jacksonville Sharks
In 2011 Hughley signed with the Jacksonville Sharks and was a key figure in their run to capture the ArenaBowl XXIV title by defeating the Arizona Rattlers, the first in Sharks franchise history. For his on the field performance he was named to the All-Ironman team.

Philadelphia Soul
In 2012 Hughley joined the Philadelphia Soul  and set the Soul's single-season record for kickoff return and combined kick return yards (1,865) and was selected to his third consecutive All-Ironman Team.

Return to Jacksonville
Hughley signed with the Jacksonville Sharks for the 2013 season.

Tampa Bay Buccaneers
On May 2, 2013, Hughley signed with the Tampa Bay Buccaneers.

Oklahoma Defenders
On February 7, 2014, Hughley signed with the Oklahoma Defenders.

Another return to Jacksonville
On June 30, 2014, the Sharks activated Hughley after having him placed on league suspension the whole season.

References

External links
 Jacksonville Sharks Bio

1985 births
Living people
American football wide receivers
American football defensive backs
American football return specialists
Averett University alumni
Tulsa Talons players
Jacksonville Sharks players
Sportspeople from Chesapeake, Virginia
Players of American football from Virginia
Philadelphia Soul players
Oklahoma Defenders players